Hanuman Temple may refer to:

Hanuman Temple, Connaught Place - temple in Connaught Place
 Hanuman Vatika, Hanuman statue of Rourkela, Orissa
Prasanna Yoga Anjaneyar Temple - temple near MIT College
Shri Hanuman Mandir, Sarangpur - temple in Sarangpur
Hanuman Temple, Kedara-Gouri - temple in Kedara-Gouri
Alattiyur Hanuman Temple - temple in Alathiyur near Tirur, Malappuram district
Karmanghat Hanuman Temple - temple in Karmanghat, near Sagar Ring Road
Hanuman Temple, Pangari (Marutichi), Tal. Shirur (Kasar), Dist. Beed, Maharashtra
Hanuman temple (for CA Students) Lakdikapool, Hyderabad

See also
List of Hindu temples in India